Uva Wellassa University (abbreviated as UWU) is a Sri Lankan national university. The university was established by government gazette effective 1 June 2005  in Badulla, Sri Lanka as the 14th national university of Sri Lanka. President Chandrika Kumaratunga established the university in 2007. The university was officially opened by Sri Lankan president Mahinda Rajapaksa on 5 August 2009.
It is the first all-entrepreneurial university in Sri Lanka. It is designed to provide essential skills and broad general education for all students while providing the conceptual and methodological background and the training to obtain practical solutions for value addition to the national resources base of Sri Lanka.

Governance and administration

Uva Wellassa University is a state university and depends on the government for much of its annual grant, which is provided by the University Grants Commission (UGC). Due to this, its administration is heavily influenced by the UGC. Undergraduate education is completely free. The governance of the university is under the provisions of the Universities Act No. 16 of 1978 and the Universities (Amendment) Act No. 7 of 1985 along with its own by-laws.

The university's administration is based upon that of the former University of Ceylon consisting of a dual structure of bodies: the Council (formally known as the University Court which is the governing body) and the Academic Senate (academic affairs).

Much of the appointments to officers and faculty are carried out by these bodies, however on the recommendations of the UGC.

Officers of the university
Chancellor
The chancellor is the head of the university and awards all degrees, although most duties are carried out by the vice-chancellor. The appointment is made by the president of Sri Lanka, to a distinguished person in academics, clergy or in the civil society. The chancellor is Most Venerable Bengamuwe Sri Dhammadinna Nayake Thero.
Vice-chancellor
Day-to-day management of the university is undertaken by the vice-chancellor, appointed by the president of Sri Lanka. The vice-chancellor is Professor Jayantha Lal Rathnasekara.

Faculties and undergraduate courses
There are four faculties providing undergraduate degrees. Four faculties are offering 13 undergraduate programs.

Faculty of Animal Science & Export Agriculture
 Aquatic Resource Technology Degree Programme
B.Sc in Aquatic Resources & Technology
 Animal Science Degree Programme
B.Sc. in Animal Production and Food Technology (Formerly, BAScHons - Bachelor of Animal Science Honours in Animal Science)
 Export Agriculture Degree Programme
B.Sc. in Export Agriculture
Palm & Latex Technology and Value Addition Degree Programme
B.Sc. in Palm & Latex Technology and Value Addition
Tea Technology & Value Addition Degree Programme
B.Sc. in Tea Technology & Value Addition

Faculty of Applied Sciences
 Science & Technology Degree Programme
B.Tech in Science & Technology
 Computer Science & Technology Degree Programme
B.Sc in Computer Science & Technology
 B.sc in Industrial Information Technology Degree Programme 
Bachelor of Industrial Information Technology
 Mineral Resources & Technology Degree Programmes
B.Sc in Water Science & Technology
B.Sc in Mineral Resources & Technology

Faculty of Management

 Department of Management Sciences
 B.BM in Entrepreneurship and Management Studies
 Department of Public Administration
 B.BM in Human Resource Development
 Department of Tourism Studies
 B.BM in Hospitality, Tourism & Events Management
 Department of English Language Teaching
 Bachelor of Arts Honours in English Language & Applied Linguistics Degree Programme

Faculty of Medicine
Bachelor of Medicine and Bachelor of Surgery (proposed in 2022)
M.B.B.S.

Faculty of Technological studies
Biosystems Technology Degree Programm
Bachelor of Biosystems Technology
Engineering Technology Degree Programme 
Bachelor of Engineering Technology in mechanical engineering
Information and Communication Technology degree program
BICT In Information and Communication Technology

Post graduate courses
The university currently offers one post-graduate degree program.
 Postgraduate Diploma in Actuarial Science

Short term courses
University offers more than 12 short-term courses and two certificate courses in Java Applications Development and Web Design.

References

External links
 Uva Wellassa University official website

Educational institutions established in 2005
Universities in Sri Lanka
Buildings and structures in Uva Province
Education in Uva Province
2005 establishments in Sri Lanka